Rocky Ray Saganiuk (born October 15, 1957) is a Canadian former professional ice hockey player who played 259 games in the National Hockey League (NHL) for the Toronto Maple Leafs and Pittsburgh Penguins.

Playing career
Born in Myrnam, Alberta, Saganiuk played junior hockey for the Kamloops Chiefs and Lethbridge Broncos. He was drafted in 1977 by the Edmonton Oilers of the World Hockey Association (WHA) and the Toronto Maple Leafs.

Saganiuk signed with the Maple Leafs and made his professional debut in 1977 with the Dallas Black Hawks of the Central Hockey League, a farm team of the Maple Leafs. He had an outstanding season for the New Brunswick Hawks of the American Hockey League (AHL) in 1978–79, for which he won the Les Cunningham Award as the most valuable player of the 1978–79 AHL season.

He played the next three seasons in the NHL with the Toronto Maple Leafs, from 1979 to 1982, scoring 24 goals and 47 points in his best season.. Before the 1983–84 season, he was traded to the Pittsburgh Penguins. He only played one season with the Penguins, playing in only 29 games.

Post-playing career
After retiring from the NHL due to injuries, Saganiuk helped develop hockey in Britain as a player-coach with both Ayr Bruins and Peterborough Pirates. He also had spells as coach of the Durham Wasps, Murrayfield Racers and Blackburn Hawks.

Saganiuk returned to North America, first as a coach in the WHL, and then as a youth hockey director in Chicago.

Career statistics

References

External links

1957 births
Living people
Baltimore Skipjacks players
Canadian ice hockey coaches
Dallas Black Hawks players
Canadian ice hockey right wingers
Edmonton Oilers (WHA) draft picks
Ice hockey people from Alberta
Kamloops Chiefs players
Lethbridge Broncos players
Lethbridge Hurricanes coaches
New Brunswick Hawks players
Pittsburgh Penguins players
Taber Golden Suns players
Toronto Maple Leafs draft picks
Toronto Maple Leafs players